Francis Bacon (30 September 1600 – c. September 1663) was an English politician who sat in the House of Commons at various times between 1645 and 1660. He supported the Parliamentary cause in the English Civil War.

Life
Bacon was the son of Sir Edward Bacon of Shrubland Hall, Barham, Suffolk, son of Queen Elizabeth's Keeper of the Great Seal Sir Nicholas Bacon by his first wife, Jane Ferneley (d. 1552). He was educated at Queens' College, Cambridge. His brother was Nathaniel Bacon.

In 1645 Bacon was elected Member of Parliament (MP) for Ipswich in the Long Parliament. In 1654 he was re-elected MP for Ipswich in the First Protectorate Parliament and was returned in 1656 and 1659 for the Second and Third Protectorate Parliaments.

In April 1660, Bacon was elected for the Convention Parliament which proclaimed the Restoration of Charles II in which he served with his brother Nathaniel and later with Sir Frederick Cornwallis Bt.

He had married Katherine, daughter of Sir Thomas Wingfield of Letheringham, Suffolk; they had six sons (of whom four died before him) and two daughters.

References

External links
 A list of the Convention Parliament

1600 births
1663 deaths
People from Barham, Suffolk
Members of the Parliament of England (pre-1707) for Ipswich
Politics of Suffolk
Roundheads
Alumni of Queens' College, Cambridge
Francis
English MPs 1640–1648
English MPs 1654–1655
English MPs 1656–1658
English MPs 1659
English MPs 1660